The Yang people, also known as the Nhang or Nyang, are a Tai-speaking ethnic group of Phongsaly Province, northwestern Laos. Chazee (1998) reports that they number 5,843 people as of 2015. The Yang are heavily influenced by Tai Lue culture, although the Yang of Namo Nua village, Oudomxay province are more heavily influenced by Tai Dam people culture (Chazee 1998:23).

Jerold Edmondson (1997) has reported that the Buyang people of southern China claim to have relatives in Phongsaly province, Laos. It is not known whether the Yang of Laos are indeed related to the Buyang of China. The Yang Zhuang of southwestern Guangxi, China are also similarly named, as well as some groups in northwestern Vietnam that are called "Nhắng".

Language

In February 1998, a 300-word basic vocabulary list of the Yang language was documented by Thongphet Kingsada and Tadahiko Shintani in Basic vocabularies of the languages spoken in Phongxaly, Lao P.D.R. (1999).

History
According to Yang elders of Nam Fa village, Vieng Poukha District, the Yang had migrated more than 200 years ago (or more than 4 generations ago) from the Dien Bien Phu area of northern Vietnam (Chazee 1998:23). Throughout Laos today, the Yang practice paddy cultivation near streams in lowlands and valleys, at elevations of between 400 and 800 meters.

The Yang of Ay village, Namo District claim to have come from the Mường Lay and Mường Sô areas of northern Vietnam over 200 years ago, where they were called "Tai Lay" (Chazee 1998:23). 12 Yang families settled in a part of Phongsaly traditionally belonging to the Tai Lue people. After two Indochinese wars, the Tai Lue returned from China to reclaim their territory, and settled in Khuang village instead, several kilometers away. There were 3 destructive fires in Ay village, in 1940, 1970, and 1991. After 1991, some families left Ay to form the two villages of Ponxay Savan and Somsavanh nearby, believing Ay to be haunted by malevolent spirits from the 1991 fire.

Distribution
The Yang are distributed in the following villages of Phongsaly, Luang Namtha, and Oudomxay provinces (Chazee 1998). Kingsada (1999) covers the Yang language of Long Ngai Kao village, Bun Neua District, Phongsaly Province, Laos.

Phongsaly
Khua District: Mone Savanh, Hat Xeui
Gnot Ou District: Xum Kham, Tha
Boun Tai District: Na Mak, Na Tene, Vieng Xai, Long Nam, Long Nay Khao
Boun Neua District: Muong Xou
Oudomxay
Beng District: Khone
Namo District: Ay, Sonsavath, Ponxay Savan, Namo Neua
Xay District: Long Ya
Luang Namtha
Vieng Poukha District: Nam Fa
Nale District: Nam Huay

Yang culture is best preserved in Vieng Poukha and Nale districts of Luang Namtha province (Chazee 1998).

References

Chazee, Laurent. 1998. Rural and ethnic diversities in Laos with special focus on the northern provinces. Presented for the Workshop on "Rural and Ethnic diversities in Laos with special focus on Oudomxay and Sayabury development realities", in Oudomxay province, 4–5 June 1998. SESMAC projects Lao/97/002 & Lao/97/003: Strengthening Economic and Social Management Capacity, Sayabury and Oudomxay provinces.

Tai peoples
Ethnic groups in Laos